The Midland Continental Railroad Depot in Wimbledon, North Dakota, United States, was built in 1913 to the east of downtown, on 17th Street SE, and was moved to 401 Railway Street in 1920.  It was listed on the National Register of Historic Places in 2003.

It is a combination passenger and freight depot, designed to allow one person to operate both functions and also to be built quickly and economically.  It was deemed significant as the only surviving Midland Continental Railroad balloon-frame railroad station.

The depot is now the Midland Continental Depot Transportation Museum, with displays about the Midland Continental Railroad and local singer Peggy Lee, whose father was the depot agent from 1934–1937.

References

External links
  Midland Continental Depot Transportation Museum - official site
 National Register of Historic Places, Wimbledon Depot

Railway stations on the National Register of Historic Places in North Dakota
Railway stations in the United States opened in 1913
Museums in Barnes County, North Dakota
Railroad museums in North Dakota
1913 establishments in North Dakota
National Register of Historic Places in Barnes County, North Dakota
Former railway stations in North Dakota
Relocated buildings and structures in North Dakota